Michala Mrůzková (nee Strnadová; born 19 October 1979) is a former Czech female canoeist who won several medals at senior level at the Wildwater Canoeing World Championships. She also has competed since the mid-2000s in canoe sprint, when she won two medals at the 2006 ICF Canoe Sprint World Championships in Szeged with a silver in the K-2 500 m and a bronze in the K-1 1000 m events.

Biography
Mrůzková also competed in two Summer Olympics, earning her best finish of eighth in the K-2 500 m event at Beijing in 2008. Mrůzková and the other legend of the Czech canoe  Kamil Mrůzek are sibling-in-law, being married to his brother.

Achievements

References

External links
 

1979 births
Canoeists at the 2004 Summer Olympics
Canoeists at the 2008 Summer Olympics
Czech female canoeists
Living people
Olympic canoeists of the Czech Republic
ICF Canoe Sprint World Championships medalists in kayak
Canoeists from Prague